Centurion Bank is a wholly submerged atoll structure in the Southwest of the Chagos Archipelago. The Centurion Bank is the southernmost feature of the Chagos group.

References

External links
Indian Ocean Pilot

Chagos Archipelago